White Plains is a city in Westchester County, New York, United States. It is the eleventh-largest city in the state of New York, an outer suburb of New York City, and the county seat and commercial hub of Westchester County, a densely populated suburban county that is home to approximately one million people. White Plains is located in south-central Westchester County.

The city's total population was 59,599 in the 2020 census, up from 53,077 at the 2010 census. According to the city government, the daytime weekday population is estimated at 250,000. The city was ranked third in the top 10 places to live in New York for 2014, according to national online real estate brokerage Movoto.

History

Early history
At the time of the Dutch settlement of Manhattan in the early 17th century, the region had been used as farmland by the Weckquaeskeck tribe, a Wappinger people, and was called "Quarropas". To early traders it was known as "the White Plains", either from the white balsam (Gnaphalium polycephalum) which was said to have covered it, or from the heavy mist that local tradition suggests hovered over the swamplands near the Bronx River. The matter was not settled until 1721, when a Royal Patent for White Plains was granted by King George II.

In 1758, White Plains became the seat of Westchester County when the colonial government for the county left West Chester, which was located in what is now the northern part of the borough of the Bronx, in New York City. The unincorporated village remained part of the Town of Rye until 1788 when the town of White Plains was created.

On July 9, 1776, a copy of the Declaration of Independence was delivered to the New York Provincial Congress, which was meeting in the county courthouse. The delegates quickly adopted a resolution approving the Declaration, thus declaring both the colony's independence and the formation of the State of New York. The Declaration itself was first publicly read from the steps of the courthouse on July 11.

During September and October 1776, troops led by George Washington took up positions in the hills of the village, hotly pursued by the British under General Sir William Howe, who attacked on October 28. The Battle of White Plains took place primarily on Chatterton Hill, (later known as "Battle Hill," and located just west of what was then a swamp but is now the downtown area) and the Bronx River. Howe's force of 4,000–6,000 British and Hessian soldiers required three attacks before the Continentals, numbering about 1,600 under the command of Generals Alexander McDougall and Israel Putnam, retreated, joining Washington's main force, which did not take part in the battle. Howe's forces had suffered 250 casualties, a severe loss, and he made no attempt to pursue the Continentals, whose casualties were about 125 dead and wounded. Three days after the battle Washington withdrew north of the village, which was then occupied by Howe's forces. But after several inconclusive skirmishes over the next week Howe withdrew on November 5, leaving White Plains to the Continentals. Ironically, one of Washington's subordinates, Major John Austin, who was probably drunk after having celebrated the enemy's withdrawal, reentered the village with his detachment and proceeded to burn it down. Although he was court-martialed and convicted for this action, he escaped punishment.

The first United States Census, conducted in 1790, listed the White Plains population at 505, of whom 46 were slaves. (New York City's population at that time was about 33,000.) By 1800, the population stood at 575 and in 1830, 830. By 1870, 26 years after the arrival of the New York Central Railroad, it had swollen to 2,630 and by 1890 to 4,508. In the decades that followed the count grew to 7,899 (1900) and 26,425 (1910). White Plains was incorporated as a village in 1866 and as a city in 1916.

Modern history

Following World War II, White Plains' downtown area developed into what amounted to a "destination" shopping district featuring branch stores of many famous New York-based department and specialty stores. Some of these retail locations were the first large-scale suburban stores built in the United States and ushered in the eventual post-war building boom. Construction of nearby parkways and expressways in the 1940s through the 1970s only enhanced White Plains' role as a retail location. With a city opening ceremony, Macy's launched a grand White Plains store on Main Street across from City Hall in 1949. As the mayor said at the time, this was a significant event in the life of White Plains. Other prestigious stores followed, such as B. Altman and Co., Rogers Peet, Saks Fifth Avenue, Lord & Taylor, Alexander's, Wallachs, and a short-lived branch of Bergdorf Goodman, which was converted to sister chain Neiman Marcus in 1981. White Plains is still a huge retail destination in the area with Bloomingdale's, Neiman Marcus, Nordstrom, Nordstrom Rack, Macy's, Burlington Coat Factory, and over 1,000 other small and mid-size stores in four malls.

During the late 1960s, the city of White Plains developed an extensive urban renewal plan for residential, commercial and mixed-use redevelopment that effectively called for the demolition of its entire central business district from the Bronx River Parkway east to Mamaroneck Avenue. By 1978, the urban renewal program centered around the construction of the Westchester County Courthouse (1974), the Westchester One office building (1975), the Galleria at White Plains mall (1978), and a number of other office towers, retail centers and smaller commercial buildings.

At the time of its construction, the Westchester One building was the largest office building between New York City and Albany, and east to Hartford.

Beginning in the 1950s, many major corporations based in New York City relocated operations to White Plains and other suburban locations. These included General Foods, PepsiCo, Hitachi USA, IBM, Nestlé, Snapple and Heineken USA. At the height of the 1980s, at least 50 Fortune 500 corporations called Westchester County and nearby Fairfield County, Connecticut, home, but with the corporate mergers and downsizing of the 1990s many of these companies either reduced their operations in White Plains or left the area completely.

White Plains continues to attract regional and national business as well as international headquarters within its boundaries such as Nine West Group, Allegiance Financial, ITT Corporation, Nokia, Heineken USA, Alliance Bernstein, AT&T and Verizon.

White Plains is also home to the Arts Exchange Building, which serves as the headquarters of the Westchester Arts Council. Since March 1999, visual and performing artists, emerging cultural organizations and new creative businesses have had studios and offices in the building. It is listed on the National Register of Historic Places.

The construction of the Galleria at White Plains mall in the 1970s ushered in a new era of downtown retail and office development, but by the early 1990s, economic development had stagnated, hampered by a deep recession and the overbuilding of the commercial real estate markets. For a time, White Plains had the dubious distinction of having one of the highest office vacancy rates in the northeastern United States. Consolidation within the retail industry led to the closing of many of downtown's original department and specialty stores as well. After its bankruptcy, the B. Altman store closed in 1989 and was eventually demolished to make way for the massive upscale retail mall, The Westchester, which opened in 1995 with anchors Nordstrom and Neiman Marcus. A freestanding branch of Macy's, one of downtown's original retail anchor stores, was relocated two blocks away to The Galleria mall by its parent company, Federated Department Stores, replacing the location of sister retailer Abraham & Straus when these two store divisions were merged in 1995.

In early 2003, the Saks Fifth Avenue location was also closed and demolished; it was replaced in 2004 with the large retail complex called The Source at White Plains, featuring the upscale restaurants Morton's of Chicago, The Cheesecake Factory, and the gourmet supermarket chain Whole Foods Markets. Note: As of July 20, 2009, the Fortunoff and Mayrock families re-acquired the Fortunoff brand and intellectual property; all Fortunoff stores are currently closed.  On August 9, 2018, the  Walmart at 275 S Main St. (one of only two in Westchester County) was closed due to lack of convenience.

Other major projects were completed in the late 1990s and early 2000s that have further altered the urban character of downtown White Plains. A new courthouse for the Southern District of New York was opened in 1998 and several large-scale office properties in and near downtown, including the former General Foods headquarters building, were retrofitted and leased to accommodate smaller businesses. The Macy's store on Main Street remained vacant for several years until it was also later demolished to make way for the massive City Center at White Plains complex. This large mixed-use development features two 35-story apartment and condominium towers,  of retail, restaurant and entertainment space and new parking facilities. Aside from the Arts Exchange building (which used to be a bank), another bank next to the City Center was renovated to become Zanaro's, a family-style Italian restaurant. Buffalo Wild Wings replaced Zanaro's upon its 2010 closure. City Center's opening in 2003 marked the beginning of a new downtown development renaissance, with an improving economy and healthy office leasing activity.

In 2007, construction was completed on Renaissance Square, a downtown parcel that includes the luxury Ritz-Carlton hotel.

Beginning in 2000, the city's permanent population experienced a growth spurt as additional apartment buildings were constructed. The city is 31 minutes by express train from Midtown Manhattan, and this has attracted new residents who commute to New York City for work. However, in large part because of its proximity to New York City, the cost of living in White Plains, although lower than that of New York City itself, is by some measures among the highest in the world. White Plains is also the home to the United States Tennis Association USTA B team.

Geography and cityscape
White Plains is bordered to the north by the town of North Castle, to the north and east by the town/village of Harrison, to the south by the town/village of Scarsdale, and to the west by the town of Greenburgh.

Climate
White Plains has a humid continental climate, with four distinct seasons. In spring and fall, temperatures can fluctuate from cool to hot, but are usually mild and comfortable. Precipitation is plentiful in all months of the year. The city receives approximately 229 clear or partly cloudy days per annum, with July typically being the sunniest month, averaging more than 70 percent of possible sunshine.

Over the course of a typical year, there are 18 days of at least  temperatures, and seven days when temperatures do not rise above the freezing point.

Tallest buildings

Neighborhoods
White Plains has 35 neighborhoods:

 Battle Hill
 Bryant Gardens
 Carhart
 Colonial Corners
 Downtown White Plains
 East White Plains
 Eastview
 Ferris Avenue
 Fisher Hill
 Fulton Street
 Gedney Farms
 Gedney Manor
 Gedney Meadows
 Gedney Park
 Green Acres
 Haviland Manor
 Highlands
 Holbrooke
 Idle Forest
 North Broadway
 North Street
 North White Plains
 Dekalb
 Old Mamaroneck Road
 Prospect Park
 Reynal Park
 Ridgeway
 Rocky Dell
 Rosedale
 Saxon Woods
 Secor Gardens
 Westminster Ridge
 Winbrook
 Woodcrest Heights

Parks and recreation

 Ebersole Ice Rink
 Maple Moor Golf Course
 Saxon Woods Park provides a range of recreational amenities, including trails, a standard and miniature golf course, and the largest swimming pool in Westchester.
 Silver Lake Preserve
 Westchester Golf Range

Economy
The economy of White Plains revolves around large companies that have relocated to the city such as ITT, Xylem, Bunge and Combe. Other companies based in White Plains include Alliance Bernstein, Dannon, Fifth Street Finance Corp., the New York Power Authority, New York-Presbyterian Hospital, Krasdale Foods (which supplies products for the C-Town supermarket chain), Nine West, Acadia Realty Trust and AboveNet, as well as the US headquarters of "Heineken USA" Heineken. At the turn of the second millennium, there was a boom in commercial businesses and residential living and as a result the city's infrastructure grew substantially with two double towers being 40 plus stories and both being high-end apartments.

At one time Prodigy had its headquarters in White Plains Plaza in White Plains. In 2000 the company announced that it would move its headquarters to Austin, Texas.

Education

Public schools
The White Plains Public School System, with a 2006 enrollment of over 6,000 students, maintains five elementary schools (grades K–5), two middle schools (Eastview for grade 6, Highlands for grades 7–8) and one high school (9–12), as well as auxiliary facilities, including a pre-kindergarten program, a community school (grades 7–12), adult and continuing education, and a program for school-age patients at New York-Presbyterian Hospital, whose campus is located in the city.

Since 1988 the district has operated under a Controlled Parents' Choice Program, whereby the parents of elementary school children can select the school which their child attends based on factors other than proximity to the school.

The five elementary schools, in addition to teaching core competencies, have different educational focuses including science and technology, communication arts and global understanding.  Two of the elementary schools offer bilingual education where children are taught in both English and Spanish.  Both English speaking and Spanish speaking families can choose to be entered into a lottery for a place in the bilingual classes.

White Plains High School, built in the late 1950s (when it relocated from The Highlands School) on a  campus (formerly James Cash Penney's 72 acre Westchester Estate, until he relocated to Westport, CT in the 1940s), serves all public school students in grades 9–12. The school has a swimming pool that overlooks a small valley which included the track and football field. The White Plains Recreation Department worked in cooperation with the schools to offer many programs.

The district is governed by a seven-member Board of Education, elected at-large for staggered three-year terms. A school superintendent reports to the Board.

Parochial or private schools
 Archbishop Stepinac High School on Mamaroneck Avenue in the Gedney area
 Good Counsel Academy, an all-girls Catholic high school for more than a century operated by the Sisters of the Divine Compassion on North Broadway, and Good Counsel Elementary (Pre-K through Grade 8, coeducational) located on the same campus close to the Pace Law School, have both closed, due to declining enrollments, and the aging and increased medical costs for the nuns of the order.,
 Our Lady of Sorrows Elementary School in the Gedney area
 German School New York on Partridge Road
 Solomon Schechter School of Westchester Lower School (Grades K-5)
 Windward School (for children with language based learning disabilities)

Colleges and universities
 Fordham University Westchester Campus is home to Fordham's Graduate Schools of Business Administration, Education, Social Service, and Religion and Religious Education.
 Pace University  The Pace University School of Law is located on North Broadway in White Plains.  This campus originally belonged to Good Counsel College, later named the College of White Plains (1972–1976). The College of White Plains merged with Pace University in 1976.  Pace formerly had a Graduate School campus in an office building on Martine Avenue in downtown White Plains.  That location has closed.
The College of Westchester, formerly known as the Westchester Business Institute
 Berkeley College (closed 2021)
 Mercy College

Demographics

As of the 2020 United States census, there were 59,559 people residing in the city. The racial makeup of the city was 46.4% white, 11.9% black, .1% Native American, 8% Asian, <.1% Pacific Islander, .3% from some other race, and 2.7% from two or more races. 32.4% were Hispanic or Latino of any race.

As of the 2010 United States census, there were 56,853 people residing in the city. The racial makeup of the city was 48.9% white, 13.2% black, .1% Native American, 6.3% Asian, <.1% Pacific Islander, .3% from some other race and 1.5% from two or more races. 29.6% were Hispanic or Latino of any race.

As of the census of 2000, there were 53,077 people, 20,921 households, and 12,704 families residing in the city. The population density was 5,415.5 people per square mile (2,091.1/km2). There were 21,576 housing units at an average density of 2,201.4 per square mile (850.1/km2). The racial makeup of the city was 64.93% white, 15.91% African American, 4.5% Asian, .34% Native American, .07% Pacific Islander, 10.37% from other races, and 3.88% from two or more races. Hispanic or Latino of any race were 23.51% of the population. In 2010, Businessweek Magazine named White Plains one of the fastest-growing cities in the United States.

There were 20,921 households, out of which 26.9% had children under the age of 18 living with them, 45.7% were married couples living together, 11.3% had a female householder with no husband present, and 39.3% were non-families. 33.4% of all households were made up of individuals, and 11.8% had someone living alone who was 65 years of age or older. The average household size was 2.47 and the average family size was 3.14.

In the city, the population was spread out, with 21.2% under the age of 18, 7.5% from 18 to 24, 32.5% from 25 to 44, 23.6% from 45 to 64, and 15.2% who were 65 years of age or older. The median age was 38 years. For every 100 females, there were 89.8 males. For every 100 females age 18 and over, there were 85.7 males.

The median income for a household in the city was $58,545, and the median income for a family was $71,891 (these figures had risen to $73,744 and $92,215 respectively as of a 2007 estimate). Males had a median income of $47,742 versus $36,917 for females. The per capita income for the city was $33,825. About 9.2% of families and 12.4% of the population were below the poverty line, including 12.2% of those under age 18 and 7.2% of those age 65 or over.

Culture

Film 
Several popular films and TV series have been filmed in White Plains, including The Departed, Across The Universe, Eighth Grade, Alex Strangelove, The Beaver, The Americans, and Sisters. The animated television series Big Mouth also plays a basketball game against the White Plains Tigers. White Plains was also selected as the original filming destination for Larry Charles' Borat, but Sacha Baron Cohen insisted the film be shot in New York City.

Performing arts
The White Plains Performing Arts Center, which can seat up to 410 people, serves as a venue for a variety of events, such as Broadway theatre and concerts.

White Plains is home to the Westchester Philharmonic, the sole professional symphony orchestra in Westchester County. The Philharmonic performs at SUNY Purchase's Performing Arts Center.

Tourism
The White Plains Farmers' Market operates year-round in the city, setting up Downtown at 255 Main Street from May to November, and in the Westchester County Center the rest of the year. In addition to the various food products sold, there is often also live music at the Market.

Sports
Westchester County Center is home to the Westchester Knicks of the NBA G League, which began play in the 2014–2015 season. Due to its use as a makeshift hospital and later vaccination center during the COVID-19 Pandemic from 2020 to 2022, the Knicks played their home games at Total Mortgage Arena in Bridgeport, Connecticut for the 2021-22 season. It was also the primary home of the New York Liberty of the Women's National Basketball Association from 2018 to 2020.

The city is also home to USA Rugby League franchise the White Plains Wombats. and North American Rugby League franchise New York Freedom.

Infrastructure

Transportation

Highways

The Cross-Westchester Expressway, or I-287, runs through White Plains, connecting Tarrytown to Rye. On its eastern end, I 287 meets I-95, the major commercial route along the East Coast. At its western end, I-287 meets I-87 and the New York State Thruway on its approach to the Tappan Zee Bridge, which crosses the Hudson River into Rockland County. The bridge allows connections to Rockland, points upstate, and parts of northern New Jersey. Current highway works include pedestrian walkways over the highway, an extra lane on either side, and on/off ramps to help motor traffic and pedestrians. Vegetation removals have upset some in the community but it is reported that the area will be fixed and trees will be replanted when work on the highway comes to an end. The Bronx River Parkway, which runs north–south through White Plains, provides access south to New York City or north to the Kensico Circle in North Castle.

Air
Often the airlines and traveling public refer to Westchester County Airport as "White Plains." It serves as a minor hub for JetBlue Airways, which offer regularly scheduled flights to several destinations in Florida. In addition, JetBlue began service from Westchester to Nassau, Bahamas in November 2011. White Plains is also located within an hour's drive of two major New York City airports.

Rail
Two Metro-North Railroad stations – the White Plains station, located downtown at Main Street and the Bronx River, and the North White Plains station, provide daily train service to Grand Central Terminal in Midtown Manhattan. Both stations are on the Harlem Line.

Bus
Bee Line is Westchester County's public bus system and several routes pass through White Plains offering local service to many surrounding communities. A few routes serve the Bronx and connect with the New York City subway. The main Bee Line hub in White Plains is the Trans-Center, adjacent to the Metro-North station. Other regional bus services that serve White Plains include the Hudson Link to Rockland County; Leprechaun Lines to Poughkeepsie; CT Transit's I-Bus to Stamford, Connecticut; as well as Greyhound, Trailways and Coach USA service to upstate New York and Long Island.

Fire department

The city of White Plains is protected by professional firefighters of the City of White Plains Fire Bureau, part of the Department of Public Safety, but commonly referred to as the "fire department"(WPFD). The White Plains Fire Department is currently the seventh-largest fire department in the state of New York. The WPFD currently operates out of 5 fire stations, located throughout the city, with each shift commanded by a deputy chief. The WPFD also operates a frontline fire apparatus fleet of 5 engines, 3 ladders, 1 rescue, and numerous other special, support, and reserve units.

Media
The Journal News, the major daily newspaper for the Lower Hudson Valley region, is based in White Plains. The current paper, owned by the Gannett Company, was formed in 1998 by the merger of eleven local papers in Westchester and Rockland counties.

White Plains is also referenced in season 6, episode 11 of Friends as the location of where Rachel bought an apothecary table that was shipped from Pottery Barn's White Plains location.

Historic sites

 Jacob Purdy House (1721), used as General George Washington's headquarters in 1778 and possibly in 1776 during the Battle of White Plains in the American Revolutionary War. In the 1960s it was repaired and restored, and in 1973 the structure was moved to its present location. A further renovation was conducted around 1980, involving both professional craftsmen and local teenagers in an apprentice program.
Elijah Miller House (1738), is a historic home in North White Plains, town of North Castle, Westchester County, New York. The house is an 18th-century Rhode Island-style farmhouse that was occupied by General George Washington on three occasions, most notably as a headquarters command post during the Battle of White Plains. In 2010 the county legislature passed a $1.2 million bond issue to finance its restoration. County executive Robert Astorino, who had supported preserving the building five years earlier as a member of the legislature, vetoed the measure, saying it should be supported by private funds.
 White Plains Armory (1910), erected on the site of the first Westchester County Courthouse. A monument in front of the building commemorates the first public reading in New York of the Declaration of Independence, on July 11, 1776.
 White Plains Rural Cemetery, incorporated 1854, although in use as a cemetery from 1797. The cemetery office occupies the structure that was the first Methodist Church in White Plains (1795, rebuilt in 1797 after a fire on the day of its original dedication).
 Percy Grainger Home and Studio, occupied by the composer from 1921 until his death in 1961, and by his widow, Ella Ström-Brandelius, until her death in 1979. It is now maintained as a museum by the International Percy Grainger Society.
 In addition to the above, the Bar Building, Good Counsel Complex, Leo Friedlander Studio, Mapleton, Peoples National Bank and Trust Company Building, Presbyterian Rest for Convalescents, Soundview Manor, and Woman's Club of White Plains are also listed on the National Register of Historic Places.

Notable people
(b) denotes that the person was born there.

 Admiral Dot, real name Leopold Kahn, little person, lived in White Plains where he founded The Admiral Dot Hotel
 Katrina Adams, former professional tennis player and former USTA president
 Richard H. Anderson, World War II ace-in-a-day
 Carolyn Bessette-Kennedy, wife of John F. Kennedy, Jr., born in White Plains (b)
 Adam Bradley, mayor of White Plains from 2010 to 2011
 Hikaru Nakamura, 5 time United States Chess Champion, and youngest American Grandmaster. Born in Japan and later moved to White Plains with his mother, brother and stepfather at the age of 2.
 Brian Burton (Danger Mouse), musician, songwriter and producer (b)
 Joseph Campbell, author and expert on myth and legend (b)
 Frank Enea, musician and composer, was born in White Plains
 Erin Cardillo, actress, was born in White Plains
 Kenneth Chamberlain, Sr., resident killed by White Plains police after his medical alert necklace was accidentally triggered
 Lynn Conway, computer scientist responsible for the Mead and Conway revolution in Very-large-scale integration design
 Glenn Cooper, thriller writer and film producer 
 John Curran, financial journalist
 Jennifer Damiano, Broadway actress, noted for her roles in Next to Normal and Spider-Man: Turn Off the Dark
 Dan Duryea, actor (b), was born in White Plains and graduated from White Plains High School in 1924 
 Johnny Farrell, golfer, 1928 U.S. Open champion, was born in White Plains
 Noah Fleiss, actor, was born in White Plains
 Drew "Dru-Ha" Friedman, hip-hop record executive of Duck Down Music Inc., born and raised in White Plains
 Channing Frye, NBA forward (b)
 Percy Grainger, Australian-born U.S. composer, pianist and conductor
 Shelley Hack, actress and supermodel (b)
 David Harbour, actor (b)
 Ellen Holly, actress
 Eric Holtz, Head Coach of the Israel National Baseball Team
 Bob Hyland, NFL lineman and candidate for mayor
 Deacon Jones, MLB infielder, born in White Plains
 Nancy Kissinger, wife of Henry Kissinger
 Jonathan Larson, writer of musical Rent (b) 
 Harry Lauter, character actor
 Alison Lurie, Pulitzer Prize–winning novelist, grew up in White Plains
 Joseph Magaletti, convicted murderer and suspected serial killer, was born in White Plains 
 Matisyahu, American Jewish reggae artist
 Jesse McCartney, singer-songwriter and actor, lived in White Plains
 Mike McGlone, actor
 John Mara, co-owner and president of the New York Giants
 Emily McLaughlin, soap opera actress
 Boyd Melson, boxer
 Art Monk, NFL Hall of Famer (wide receiver) played football for White Plains High School
 Chris Murphy, United States Senator  (b)
 Sun Myung Moon and his wife Hak Ja Han Moon founder of the Unification Church 
 Tommy O'Sullivan, rower at Row America Rye, philanthropist, poet
 Garrick Ohlsson, classical pianist
 Joseph Polchinski, theoretical physicist and string theorist (b)
 Scott Reiniger, actor, and, as "Prince of Ghor", a hereditary prince (b)
 JD Roberto, game show host and writer best known for hosting Shop 'Til You Drop from 2003 to 2005, replacing former host Pat Finn. (b)
 Jimmy Roberts, journalist and broadcaster
 Vanessa Rousso, professional poker player (b)
 Bhaskar Sunkara, political writer
 Andrew S. Tanenbaum, computer scientist and professor
 Micah Townshend, Secretary of State of Vermont
 Ralph Waite, actor who played John Walton in The Waltons television series (b)
 Chris Watson, American-Israeli basketball player
 James Whitmore, actor known for such films as The Asphalt Jungle and The Shawshank Redemption  (b)
 Mark Zuckerberg, founder and CEO of Facebook  (b)

References

External links

 White Plains official website
 White Plains Historical Society

 
1683 establishments in the Province of New York
Cities in New York (state)
Cities in the New York metropolitan area
Cities in Westchester County, New York
County seats in New York (state)
Plains of the United States
Populated places established in 1683